Donald Scott (born February 23, 1992) is an American track and field athlete who competes in the triple jump. Scott earned bronze medal in triple jump at 2022 World Indoor Championships. He equalled that mark, to win the 2019 USA Outdoor Track and Field Championships. He is a 2017 and 2019 U.S. Indoor Triple Jump Champion and a 2018 U.S. Outdoor Champion. Scott is a third-year volunteer coach (since 2015) at Eastern Michigan University.

Career
In his first season as a professional, Scott earned eighth place at the 2015 USATF Outdoor Championships and a fourth place at the USA Indoor Championships. In 2017, Scott took third at the Outdoor USA Championships, securing his spot on Team USA for the World Championships in London. In 2018, Scott placed second in triple jump at the 2018 Athletics World Cup and third at the 2018 IAAF Diamond League Final.

NCAA Coaching
Coach Donald Scott worked with Eastern Michigan University until 2019 under the direction of John Goodridge.

NCAA
Scott attended Eastern Michigan University (EMU), where he earned a degree in criminal justice. Scott set many records at EMU in track and field. While competing for the Eagles, Scott brought home nine Mid-American Conference (MAC) titles and two NCAA Division 1 All-American honors, and set the MAC and school record for the triple jump. He also came away his senior year with a 2014 NCAA Division I Outdoor Track and Field Championships, a third-place finish for the triple jump, and a runner-up finish indoors.

Prep
From Apopka, Florida, a suburb of Orlando, Scott attended Apopka High School.

References

External links
 
 
 
 
 
 
 Donald Scott at athletebiz.us
 Donald Scott at Eastern Michigan University
 
 

Living people
1992 births
People from Apopka, Florida
Sportspeople from Orange County, Florida
Track and field athletes from Florida
American male triple jumpers
African-American male track and field athletes
Eastern Michigan Eagles men's track and field athletes
Eastern Michigan University alumni
World Athletics Championships athletes for the United States
USA Indoor Track and Field Championships winners
USA Outdoor Track and Field Championships winners
Athletes (track and field) at the 2020 Summer Olympics
Olympic track and field athletes of the United States
21st-century African-American sportspeople
World Athletics Indoor Championships medalists